Kornelija Kvesić (born 25 August 1963 in Kakanj, SR Bosnia and Herzegovina, SFR Yugoslavia) is a Yugoslav and Bosnian former female professional basketball player.

References

External links

1963 births
Living people
People from Kakanj
Croats of Bosnia and Herzegovina
Yugoslav women's basketball players
Centers (basketball)
Olympic basketball players of Yugoslavia
Basketball players at the 1988 Summer Olympics
Olympic silver medalists for Yugoslavia
Olympic medalists in basketball
Panathinaikos WBC players
Universiade medalists in basketball
Universiade bronze medalists for Yugoslavia
Medalists at the 1988 Summer Olympics
Medalists at the 1985 Summer Universiade
Bosnia and Herzegovina women's basketball players
Bosnia and Herzegovina expatriate basketball people in Croatia